Thanga Magan is a 2015 Indian Tamil-language coming of age family drama film written and directed by Velraj. Dhanush produced and stars in the film alongside Samantha Ruth Prabhu and Amy Jackson.

The film entered production in March 2015 and was released on 18 December 2015. The film performed badly at the box office.

Plot
Tamizh, his wife Yamuna, and mother move into an uncomfortable home. Tamizh leaves them with his friend Kumaran while he looks for a job. All the companies are pleased with his resume but are hesitant to give him a job due to occurrences in his past job. Desperate, Tamizh gets a job at a roadside biriyani shop. He comes home for the night after he gets drunk, and flashback starts.

5 years earlier, college student Tamizh, Kumaran, and Tamizh's cousin Aravind were inseparable friends. One day, Tamizh's mother tells him to go to the temple for a pooja (blessing ceremony). There he meets Hema, who is an Anglo-Indian and architect student and likes her. Tamizh and Kumaran leave out Aravind, as they feel due to his better looks, he might hinder their attempts at the girls. Tamizh starts to woo her and the two eventually fall in love, while Kumaran and Tamizh's neighbour Revathi also fall in love. For their first anniversary, Tamizh, Hema, Kumaran, and Hema's friend Revathi go to Darjeeling without telling Aravind and Tamizh's father Vijayraghavan. Feeling guilty, he decides he will tell them both the truth once he goes back to Chennai. But Aravind has followed the group, says he never wants to see Tamizh again for betraying him, and storms off. Later, when Hema and Tamizh are discussing their future, Tamizh learns that Hema doesn't envision his parents living with them in their marital home. This infuriates Tamizh and they both fight, eventually leading to their breakup.

They both move on with their own lives. Tamizh starts work as a junior officer at his father's Income Tax office, Hema marries Aravind. Later Tamizh's family arranges his marriage with Yamuna. They gradually fall in love with each other and eventually forgets Hema. One day, Vijayraghavan returns home tense and shouts at his wife. The next morning, when Yamuna opens the bathroom door, it is found that Vijayraghavan had hung himself. Everybody accuses him of stealing an important tax file from his office. Tamizh is also suspended without pay and the Govt Quarters Chief evicts him due to bad name. At the same time Yamuna informs her family that she might be pregnant.

In the present, Tamizh tries to gather information about his father. A close friend of Vijayraghavan sees Tamizh and says Vijayraghavan once mentioned a bag of money. So Tamizh goes to see his boss Prakash, who tells him he gave Vijayraghavan 50 million rupees to protect from an impending raid, but Vijayraghavan forgot what he did with the money. Prakash thinks he stole it, so he took the tax file, and demanded Vijayraghavan return the money to get the file back. Tamizh remembers Vijayraghavan once arguing with Aravind, so he goes to see him about the money. Aravind denies knowing about it. Later, Hema confronts Aravind, who admits he took the money for his business, but was going to return it once he was settled, but Vijayraghavan killed himself before that. Hema meets Yamuna in the temple and tells her the truth behind the money. Tamizh searches Aravind's house and learns that Aravind is going to use the money to pay for a construction investment. Kumaran tricks the builder into revealing details about the deal closure, and convinces the dealer to change the meeting time from 7:00 to 11:00. Aravind shows up at 7:00 and encounters Tamizh there. After a brief altercation, Tamizh takes the money with him, but it amounts to just 10 million.

That night, thieves try to steal the money, but Tamizh wards them off. The next day, Tamizh is tipped off that there will be an income tax raid at his house. Tamizh has Kumaran protect the money, but Aravind intercepts Kumaran and takes it back. Tamizh tracks down one of Aravind's associates who has 40 of the 50 million rupees. Tamizh beats him up and takes the money back. Aravind finds out about this and tries to protect the rest, eventually losing his mind in the process. Tamizh visits Aravind and reminds him how happy they were when before money was involved. Aravind realizes his mistake and gives the money back to Tamizh, asking for his forgiveness. Tamizh goes to Prakash with the money and asks for the tax file back. But Prakash reveals that he sold the file for 500 million rupees and that Tamizh should take 50 million to forget the issue. Tamizh doesn't want it and tells Prakash to accept his mistake and cancel his suspension.

Same night, Tamizh takes Yamuna to the hospital because she is having labour pains. En route, Prakash's goons try to kill Tamizh, but he successfully fights back. He later calls Prakash and tells him to turn on the news, where his assistant is revealing Prakash's corrupt activities. Tamizh then tells him that he gave his assistant the 50 million rupees to confess. Prakash is arrested, and Yamuna gives birth to a boy. The film ends with a happy Tamizh leaving for work.

Cast

 Dhanush as Thamizh Vijayraghavan
 Samantha Ruth Prabhu as Yamuna Thamizh, Thamizh's wife.
 Amy Jackson as Hema D'Souza, Tamizh's ex girlfriend and Aravind's wife.(Voiceover by Andrea Jeremiah)
 K. S. Ravikumar as Vijayraghavan, Thamizh's father
 Raadhika Sarathkumar as Thamizh's mother
 Adith Arun as Aravind, Thamizh's cousin
 Sathish as Kumaran, Thamizh's friend
 Jayaprakash as Prakash Kumar, Thamizh's boss
 M. S. Bhaskar as Prakash's assistant
 Seetha as Aravind's mother
 Shan as Varun
 Uday Mahesh as Jen Builders agent
 Poorthi Pravin as Revathi, Hema's friend and Kumaran's wife
 Velraj as Ramalingam (cameo appearance)

Production
Following the success of Velaiilla Pattadhari (2014), Dhanush and Velraj announced that they would work together for another project during October 2014, and stated the film would not be a sequel to their previous film.  In December 2014, Jackson revealed via Twitter that she had been signed on to feature in the film. During the same month, Samantha Ruth Prabhu also joined the team, which reprised several crew members from the director's previous venture. Sathish was selected to play a supporting role, while K. S. Ravikumar and Raadhika were signed on to play Dhanush's parents in the film.

The team began production in March 2015 without a title, and the project remained untitled until October 2015, a month before the film's release. It developed under the working title of VIP 2, and the team denied reports of it being titled Tea Kadai Raja and Thamizh Magan, before settling on Thanga Magan. The first schedule involved Dhanush and Amy Jackson, with the former shaving his beard to appear as a teenager in the portions. Scenes involving Samantha portraying Dhanush's wife were shot in May 2015, with the team recreating the effect of rainy backdrop in a studio in Chennai. Amy Jackson finished work in the film in June 2015, after filming sequences alongside the other two lead actors. The film completed its final schedule in July 2015 by canning a fight scene and montage shots, without the presence of Velraj, who had to prioritise his work as a cinematographer for another film, Paayum Puli. The director consequently denied reports that he had a fall out with the rest of the team.

Release
Thanga Magans Tamil Nadu theatrical rights were sold to Sri Green Productions. The film was released on 18 December 2015.

Reception
DNA India rated the film 3 stars and said, "Watch the movie for the fine performances by the lead actors." Filmibeat rated the film 3.0/5 and said, "Thanga Magan, though not as impressive as Velaiyilla Pattathari, manages to make you laugh and weep. It also most definitely, entertains you." Behindwoods rated the film 2.5 out of 5 and wrote, "On the whole, Thanga Magan does justice to its cause, which is to entertain, but doesn't keep the audience engrossed." Tamilglitz rated the film 2.5 out of 5 and called it "a simple movie which is worth [watching]".

Awards and nominationsFilmfare Awards South '
Won-Filmfare Award for Best Female Playback Singer - Tamil - Swetha Mohan - Enna Solla
Won-Filmfare Award for Best Supporting Actress-Tamil - Raadhika Sarathkumar
Nominated-Filmfare Award for Best Male Playback Singer - Tamil - Dhanush - Oh oh
Nominated-Filmfare Award for Best Supporting Actor - Tamil - K. S. Ravikumar

Soundtrack

The soundtrack of the movie was composed by Anirudh Ravichander and was released on 23 November 2015.

External links
  Thanga Magan at IMDB

References

2015 films
Indian action drama films
Films scored by Anirudh Ravichander
2010s Tamil-language films
Indian family films
2015 action drama films